Joseph Mousseau may refer to:

 Joseph Octave Mousseau (1844–1898), physician and political figure in Quebec
 Joseph-Alfred Mousseau (1837–1886), French Canadian politician